Migration for Employment Convention (Revised), 1949 is  an International Labour Organization Convention for migrant workers.

It was established in 1949, with the preamble stating:
Having decided upon the adoption of certain proposals with regard to the revision of the Migration for Employment Convention, 1939,...

And the Article 1 states that: Each Member of the International Labour Organisation for which this Convention is in force undertakes to make available on request to the International Labour Office and to each Member,
a) information on national policies, law and regulations relating to emigration and immigration.
b) information on special provisions concerning migration for employment and the conditions of work and livelihood of migrants for employment.
c) information concerning general agreement and special arrangements on these questions concluded by the Member.

The convention was followed up by Migrant Workers (Supplementary Provisions) Convention, 1975 and United Nations Convention on the Protection of the Rights of All Migrant Workers and Members of Their Families.

Modification 

The principles contained in the convention are a revision of ILO Convention C66, Migration for Employment Convention, 1939, which was not ratified by any countries and never came into force.

Ratifications 
As of 2021, the convention has been ratified by 53 states. Former parties to the statute include Yugoslavia and Zanzibar.

External links 
Text.
Ratifications.

Migrant workers
International Labour Organization conventions
Treaties concluded in 1949
Treaties entered into force in 1952
Treaties of Albania
Treaties of Algeria
Treaties of Armenia
Treaties of the Bahamas
Treaties of Barbados
Treaties of Belgium
Treaties of Belize
Treaties of Bosnia and Herzegovina
Treaties of Burkina Faso
Treaties of the military dictatorship in Brazil
Treaties of Cameroon
Treaties of the Comoros
Treaties of Cuba
Treaties of Cyprus
Treaties of Dominica
Treaties of Ecuador
Treaties of the French Fourth Republic
Treaties of West Germany
Treaties of Grenada
Treaties of Guatemala
Treaties of Guyana
Treaties of Israel
Treaties of Italy
Treaties of Jamaica
Treaties of Kenya
Treaties of Kyrgyzstan
Treaties of Madagascar
Treaties of Malawi
Treaties of Malaysia
Treaties of Mauritius
Treaties of Moldova
Treaties of Montenegro
Treaties of the Netherlands
Treaties of New Zealand
Treaties of Nigeria
Treaties of Norway
Treaties of the Philippines
Treaties of Portugal
Treaties of Saint Lucia
Treaties of Serbia and Montenegro
Treaties of Sierra Leone
Treaties of Slovenia
Treaties of Somalia
Treaties of Francoist Spain
Treaties of Tajikistan
Treaties of Tanzania
Treaties of North Macedonia
Treaties of Trinidad and Tobago
Treaties of the United Kingdom
Treaties of Uruguay
Treaties of Venezuela
Treaties of Yugoslavia
Treaties of Zambia
Treaties extended to the West Indies Federation
Treaties extended to the Colony of the Bahamas
Treaties extended to British Honduras
Treaties extended to the Bechuanaland Protectorate
Treaties extended to the Colony of North Borneo
Treaties extended to the British Virgin Islands
Treaties extended to British Cyprus
Treaties extended to the Gambia Colony and Protectorate
Treaties extended to Guernsey
Treaties extended to British Guiana
Treaties extended to Jersey
Treaties extended to British Kenya
Treaties extended to the Isle of Man
Treaties extended to British Mauritius
Treaties extended to the Colony and Protectorate of Nigeria
Treaties extended to Tanganyika (territory)
Treaties extended to the Uganda Protectorate
Treaties extended to Northern Rhodesia
Treaties extended to the Sultanate of Zanzibar
1949 in labor relations